Black Knight (27 August 1979–2002) was an Australian Thoroughbred  racehorse. He was best known for winning the Melbourne Cup at Flemington Racecourse in November 1984.

Background
Black Knight was a dark bay horse bred in Western Australia by his owner Robert Holmes à Court, a South-African born businessman described during the 1980s as Australia's richest man. He was sired by Silver Knight, a New Zealand-bred stallion who won the Melbourne Cup in 1971. The horse was sent into training with the veteran George Hanlon at his training base at Leopold, Victoria. Black Knight was gelded early in his life and usually raced in blinkers.

Racing career
Black Knight established himself as a contender for the 1984 Melbourne Cup when finishing placed behind Chagemar in the Geelong Cup and The Dalgety. In the build-up to the race, the gelding was the subject of a major gamble, being backed down from odds of 50/1 to 11/1 shortly before the event. Despite the support of betters, Black Knight's regular jockey Robert Heffernan rejected him, preferring to ride Martian's Son. The Sydney-based jockey Peter Cook, who had only ever seen the horse on television, was booked to take the ride on four days before the race. In the Cup, Black Knight carried 50kg started at odds of 10/1 in a field of nineteen runners. Cook sent him into the lead 250 metres from the finish and he stayed on to win by two and a half lengths from Chagemar. His success gave Hanlon his third success in the race following Piping Lane in 1972 and Arwon in 1978.

Retirement
After his retirement from racing, Black Knight was retrained as a police horse, and served for several years with the Victoria Police. He was retired from duty in 1995, although he regularly took part in parades of past winners before the running of the Melbourne Cup. In July 2002 he contracted a bacterial infection which led to kidney failure. He was euthanised and buried on the farm where he had spent his retirement.

Pedigree

References

1979 racehorse births
2002 racehorse deaths
Melbourne Cup winners
Racehorses bred in Australia
Racehorses trained in Australia
Thoroughbred family 13-e